Stephen Lewis Boock  (born 20 September 1951) is a former New Zealand cricketer who played 30 Tests and 14 One Day Internationals.

He is the brother of sports journalist Richard Boock (biographer of Bert Sutcliffe) and award-winning novelist and screenwriter Paula Boock.

Domestic career
Boock was a slow left-arm orthodox bowler and is one of a small number of New Zealanders to have taken over 600 first class wickets. After a Test against Pakistan at Wellington in 1985 he achieved a career high of 9th place in the ICC rankings for Test cricket (applied retrospectively, as the rankings were not introduced until 1987).

International career
Boock made his Test debut at Wellington in February 1978 in New Zealand's maiden Test victory over England. He made his first overseas tour a few months later in England and in the Test Match at Trent Bridge conceded just 29 runs in a 28 over spell which included 18 maidens and 2 wickets.

In 1979/80, at the dramatic conclusion to the First Test against Clive Lloyd's West Indians at Carisbrook, Dunedin, Boock joined Gary Troup at the crease with New Zealand 100 for 9 and needing four more runs to win this historic match. The two tail enders took the Black Caps to their first test win over the West Indies, and what would ultimately become their first series win over the Caribbean giants, when they scrambled through for a leg bye as scores were level. In a controversial tour, marred by umpiring disputes and some ugly on field behaviour by the tourists, New Zealand won the series 1–0 after drawing the next two tests in Christchurch and Auckland.

In 1983–84 New Zealand won their first ever series over England and Boock took 4 for 37 at Christchurch.

In 1984–85 against Pakistan at Niaz Stadium he took his career best innings figures of 7 for 87.

In 1985–86, during the Black Caps' first Test series win over Australia, Boock had a rare success with the bat. He contributed 37 runs in a New Zealand record tenth-wicket partnership of 124 with John Bracewell (83 not out) in the Second Test at the SCG. New Zealand won the series 2–1.

Stephen Boock, when bowling for New Zealand against Pakistan in 1989, conceded the most runs for a New Zealander in a test innings. His 70 overs, 10 maidens for 1 wickets cost 229 runs. This was also the most expensive bowling figures in New Zealand first class cricket until 2010.

Life post-cricket
Boock and his wife owned a supermarket businesses from 1991 until their retirement in 2016.

In 1992 he launched a high-profile campaign for Dunedin's mayoralty. He was unsuccessful, but was elected to the city council for the southern ward.

Boock was a director of NZ Cricket for 10 years and was President of NZ Cricket from 2012 to 2016. He is Chairman of the Otago Special Olympics Trust.

Honours
In the 2016 New Year Honours, Boock was appointed an Officer of the New Zealand Order of Merit for services to sport and the community.

References

External links

1951 births
Living people
Canterbury cricketers
New Zealand One Day International cricketers
New Zealand Test cricketers
New Zealand cricketers
Otago cricketers
Officers of the New Zealand Order of Merit
Dunedin City Councillors
Cricketers at the 1987 Cricket World Cup
New Zealand sportsperson-politicians
South Island cricketers